The Ballymena and Provincial Football League is a regional football league in Northern Ireland. The league has a Premier Division with intermediate status and three junior divisions: Junior Divisions 1, 2 and 3.

History
The league was formed as the Ballymena and District Junior League in 1948, with twelve founding members, including Moyola Park F.C., the only original member club that still retains membership through its reserve team. In 1983, the name was changed to the Ballymena and District Premier League, and in 1990, intermediate status was granted to the top division and the league was renamed as the Ballymena and Provincial Intermediate League. The league subsequently changed its name again to the current Ballymena and Provincial Football League.

Intermediate clubs in membership (2022–23) 
Intermediate Division

Junior-level FC 
List of Junior-level FC

 Clough Rangers Athletic F.C.

Format

Intermediate Division
Currently, fourteen teams play in the Intermediate Division. The league champions can be promoted to NIFL Premier Intermediate League, providing they meet the admittance requirements.

Cups
Cups that are currently available to the Ballymena & Provincial Intermediate Leagues are:

Crawford Cup;
McReynolds Cup;
O'Gorman Cup;
Canada Trophy; 
Linda Welshman Memorial Cup;

and teams in the junior divisions can play in the Irish Junior Cup.

List of champions

''Source: nifootball

References

External links 
 Ballymena & Provincial League - (Official Website)

4
Association football in County Antrim
North